Corato is a town and comune in Italy.  It is located in the Metropolitan City of Bari, Apulia, in southeastern Italy. Founded by the Normans, it became subject to Alfonso V, king of Aragon, at the end of the 15th century, and later to the Carafa family. The chief feature of the old town centre, which is surrounded by modern buildings, is the Romanesque church.  It is a twin city of Grenoble, France, where many Coratini immigrated during the 20th  century.

History
Corato  was founded in 1046 by Peter I of Trani, adding a castle, four angular towers, the perimetery enclosing walls, four access gates, and two main perpendicular streets.  These elements, typical of a mediaeval town, were preserved until the 16th century. From the 17th century onwards Corato started to extend from all four sides of the Norman falling walls, and numerous churches and aristocratic palaces were built.

It is well known for the olive production: the Coratina olive's name comes from Corato.

On 12 July 2016, a head-on collision between two passenger trains occurred near Corato. At least 23 people were killed and dozens more injured.

Main sights
The town hall, built in the 16th century as a monastery.  
The Cathedral, Corato's oldest church, together with the San Vito church. It was built in the 12th century is Romanesque style. The portal features the statues of Jesus Christ, the Virgin and St. John the Baptist.
De Mattis Palace (15th century). It has a stone with diamond point covering the first level of the palace. At the corner is Patroni Griffi's emblem, an aristocratic family which owned this palace. The emblem represents a griffon (Griffi's coat of arms ) and a hand which holds an anchor (Patroni's coat of arms).
Catalano Palace, also from the 15th century. 
The museum, once a prison. It includes two sections, devoted to historical-archeological and anthropological findings respectively.

International relationships

Corato is twinned with:
  Grenoble, France

References

External links
 Official website